Chinta Chandrashekar Rao (born 25 September 1988) was an Indian football player who is currently the head coach for Bangalore Super Division club 'Sporting Club Bangalore'.

External links
 
 Profile at Goal.com

1988 births
Living people
Indian footballers
I-League players
Sporting Clube de Goa players
Salgaocar FC players
Chirag United Club Kerala players
United SC players
Mumbai Tigers FC players
Association football defenders
George Telegraph S.C. players
Ozone FC players
I-League 2nd Division players
India youth international footballers